Power to the People was a political party in Transnistria.

In the 10 December 2000 legislative elections, the party won 1 out of 43 seats. In the 11 December 2005 elections the party did not field any candidates, and instead supported independent candidates who were allied with the Renewal party.

Election results 

Political parties in Transnistria